This is a list of prime ministers of the Czech Republic, a political office that was created in 1993 following the dissolution of Czechoslovakia.

The Czech Republic is a parliamentary representative democracy, with the Prime Minister acting as head of government and the President acting as head of state.

The first Prime Minister of the Czech Republic was Václav Klaus, who served as the second President from 7 March 2003 until 7 March 2013. The current and 13th Prime Minister is Petr Fiala, leader of the ODS, who was appointed by the President on November 28, 2021.

Czech and Slovak Federative Republic (1990–1992)
6 March 1990 – 31 December 1992: called "Czech Republic" within Czechoslovakia.

Prime Ministers of the Czech Republic 

 Parties

Czech Republic (1993–present)
From 1 January 1993 after the dissolution of Czechoslovakia.

Prime Ministers of the Czech Republic

 Parties

Timeline

See also 
List of rulers of Bohemia
List of presidents of Czechoslovakia
List of prime ministers of Czechoslovakia
List of prime ministers of the Czech Socialist Republic
List of rulers of the Protectorate Bohemia and Moravia
List of presidents of the Czech Republic
Lists of incumbents

External links 
Prime Minister - Government of the Czech Republic

References 

 
Czech Republic
Government of the Czech Republic
Prime Ministers